(known also by its trademark Nachi) is a Japanese corporation known for its industrial robots, machining tools and systems and machine components.

Nachi-Fujikoshi is listed on the Tokyo Stock Exchange and as of January 2014, comprises 50 companies (22 domestic and 28 overseas).

Origin of the Nachi trademark 
The Nachi brand name comes from "Kumano Nachi Taisha", the Grand Shrine. It expresses strong entrepreneurial will.

In 1929, the Emperor Showa made a tour of the Kansai district to inspect industries as part of the encouragement of domestic production, and personally inspected a Fujikoshi hacksaw blade that was on display as an example of an outstanding domestic product at the Osaka Prefectural Office. Overjoyed at the honor of entertaining the Emperor's special attention, Kohki Imura decided to name his product "NACHI" after the name of the latest naval cruiser to be made in Japan, the very same vessel that the Emperor was sailing on for his tour.

Business segments and products

Machining 
Cutting tools
Drills
End mills
Gear cutters
Broaches
Machine tools
Broaching machines
Precision roll forming machines
Power finishers

Robots 
Spot welding
Handling
Arc welding
Controller

Components 
Bearings
Excel series radial ball bearings
Radial roller bearings
Thrust ball bearings
Thrust roller bearings
Hydraulic equipment
Valves
Motors
Pumps
Unit

Materials 
Special steels
Industrial furnaces
Ion plating equipment for mass production processing

See also

 Industrial robot
 Anti-Japanese sentiment in Korea
 Japanese war crimes
 Korean Women's Volunteer Labour Corps

References

External links 
 Main Corporate Site 

Robotics companies of Japan
Companies based in Toyama Prefecture
Companies listed on the Tokyo Stock Exchange
Manufacturing companies established in 1928
Manufacturing companies of Japan
Industrial robotics
Anti-Japanese sentiment in Korea
Anti-Korean sentiment in Japan
Bearing manufacturers
Defense companies of Japan
Japanese brands
Japanese imperialism and colonialism
1928 establishments in Japan